The second USS Bazely (DE-2) was a Lend-Lease destroyer escort in the United States Navy. She served in the Royal Navy as HMS Bazely (K311) during World War II. The ship was returned to the United States following the war and was discarded shortly thereafter. She was named for John Bazely.

Service history
Bazely was laid down on 5 April 1942 by the Boston Navy Yard and launched on 27 June 1942. Allocated to the Royal Navy under lend lease on 18 February 1943, Bazely given the pendant number K311. She earned battle honours in the Atlantic Ocean between 1943 and 1945 and in the Arctic Ocean in 1945. During her wartime career under the White Ensign, she figured prominently in the destruction of three German submarines. She teamed with Blackwood to sink  on 25 November.

The Royal Navy returned Bazely to American hands on 20 August 1945 at Chatham, England. Manned by officers and men from the frigate , that had been turned over to the Royal Navy after service in the U.S. Navy under reverse Lend-Lease, the former  frigate was commissioned as Bazely (DE 2) at 0810 the day of her return (20 August 1945).

After having embarked 39 passengers, Bazely got under way eight days later for the first leg of her homeward voyage. The next morning, she stood out of The Downs and sailed in Task Group (TG) 21.3, one of ten former British destroyer escorts being returned to the country of origin. She reached the Philadelphia Naval Shipyard on the evening of 8 September 1945, and remained there, inactive save for shifting berths and unloading ammunition at Fort Mifflin, through mid-October. On the afternoon of 22 October 1945, Bazely was decommissioned. Her name was struck from the Navy list on 16 November 1945, and the navy yard completed breaking her up by 28 May 1946.

References

Captain-class frigates
Evarts-class destroyer escorts
Ships transferred from the United States Navy to the Royal Navy
World War II frigates of the United Kingdom
Ships built in Boston
1942 ships